Alaska Route 10 refers to two unconnected highways in the U.S. state of Alaska:
Copper River Highway
Edgerton Highway and McCarthy Road

References

10